Tomarata is a locality in the Auckland Region of New Zealand. Wellsford lies to the south-west, Te Arai to the north, and Pakiri to the south-east. Tomarata Lake is nearby and is popular for boating, water skiing, kayaking and swimming.

History

Tomarata was a location for the late 19th/early 20th century kauri gum digging trade.

Education
Tomarata School is a coeducational full primary (years 1–8) school with a roll of  students as of

Notes

External links
 Tomarata School website

Rodney Local Board Area
Populated places in the Auckland Region